Gurjinder Singh may refer to:
 Gurjinder Singh (footballer, born 1987), Indian footballer
 Gurjinder Singh (footballer, born 1997), Greek footballer
 Gurjinder Singh (field hockey) (born 1994), Indian field hockey player